Kanash is the name of several inhabited localities in Russia.

Urban localities
Kanash, a town in the Chuvash Republic

Rural localities
Kanash, Republic of Bashkortostan, a village in Slakbashevsky Selsoviet of Belebeyevsky District in the Republic of Bashkortostan
Kanash, Morgaushsky District, Chuvash Republic, a vyselok in Yunginskoye Rural Settlement of Morgaushsky District in the Chuvash Republic
Kanash, Shemurshinsky District, Chuvash Republic, a settlement in Shemurshinskoye Rural Settlement of Shemurshinsky District in the Chuvash Republic
Kanash, Yadrinsky District, Chuvash Republic, a village in Bolshesundyrskoye Rural Settlement of Yadrinsky District in the Chuvash Republic
Kanash, Kaliningrad Oblast, a settlement in Zhilinsky Rural Okrug of Nemansky District in Kaliningrad Oblast
Kanash, Kemerovo Oblast, a selo in Trudarmeyskaya Rural Territory of Prokopyevsky District in Kemerovo Oblast; 
Kanash, Krasnoyarsk Krai, a village in Sakhaptinsky Selsoviet of Nazarovsky District in Krasnoyarsk Krai
Kanash, Novosibirsk Oblast, a village in Severny District of Novosibirsk Oblast
Kanash, Verkhneuslonsky District, Republic of Tatarstan, a village in Verkhneuslonsky District of the Republic of Tatarstan
Kanash, Zainsky District, Republic of Tatarstan, a village in Zainsky District of the Republic of Tatarstan
Kanash, Tyumen Oblast, a selo in Kanashsky Rural Okrug of Nizhnetavdinsky District in Tyumen Oblast